Eden (also known as Eden Halt) was a station located in the townland of Eden, in and around the town of Carrickfergus in Northern Ireland. At one time it formed part of a tight cluster of stations, each located almost one minute from the other, from Mount through to Kilroot.

The station closed in 1977 when Northern Ireland Railways rationalised their services. It has now been dismantled.

Eden Halt is the title of a book by Ross Skelton.

References

Disused railway stations in County Antrim
Railway stations opened in 1925
Railway stations closed in 1977
1925 establishments in Northern Ireland
1977 disestablishments in Northern Ireland
Railway stations in Northern Ireland opened in the 20th century